Cherry Prayer ( 樱桃祈祷文 ) is a work for solo piano,
composed by He Xuntian in 2015.

Summary
He Xuntian adopted RD Composition, SS Composition and Five Nons in his work Cherry Prayer.

Inspiration
Cherry Prayer was inspired from Xuntian He’s ideology:
"for all species."
"Non-Western, non-Eastern, non-academic, non-folk, and non-non." 
"Believer"

References

External links
Cherry Prayer published by Schott Musik International, Germany

Compositions for piano by He Xuntian
Compositions for solo piano
2015 compositions